Law enforcement in Mexico is divided between federal, state, and municipal (local) entities. There are two federal police forces, 31 state police forces and two for Mexico City, and, an investigation of the Executive Secretariat of the National Public Safety System, indicates that there are 1,807 municipal police forces. There are 366 officers per 100,000 people, which equals approximately 500,000 in total, but systemic corruption is endemic and police forces are often poorly trained and underpaid. The average wage of a police officer is $350 per month, around that of a builder's labourer, which means that many police officers supplement their salaries with bribes.

The government struggles to provide police forces with sufficient pay and protection to make it worthwhile resisting the threats and blandishments of drug traffickers, though recent efforts to reform the federal police saw a tenth of the 30,000+ officers fired in the first eight months of 2010. There has been a tendency to increase the militarization of policing. In 2006, 45,000 troops of the Mexican Army were deployed to fight Drug cartels, with the number rising to 50,000 by October 2010. In Monterrey, police, soldiers, and prosecutors have conducted joint patrols, which have seen violence reduced.

At all levels, policing in Mexico tends to maintain separate forces for patrol/response (preventive) policing on the one hand and investigative (judicial) policing on the other.

Organization

Federal

Mexico maintains two primary Federal Police agencies; the National Guard, the uniformed paramilitary force, and an Investigative force called the Policía Federal Ministerial. They are sometimes referred to by Hollywood and the American media by the slang term "Federales."

Former agencies

Federal Police

The Federal Police (Policía Federal, PF), was the most prominent police force in Mexico. It was under the guidance of the Secretariat of the Interior (SEGOB), the PF was nominally a "preventive" police force with significant powers of investigation to prevent crime.

The PF replaced the Federal Preventive Police, which was created in 1999 combining several police forces into one, but lacking any investigative powers. When the PF was created a large number of investigators from the Federal Investigations Agency (AFI) were transferred and the AFI was replaced by the Ministerial Federal Police. In 2019, the PF was merged into part of the now reactivated National Guard.

Ministerial Federal Police

The Ministerial Federal Police (Policía Federal Ministerial, PFM) is the premier investigative arm of the Attorney General of Mexico (FGR).

The PFM replaced the earlier Federal Investigations Agency (Agencia Federal de Investigación, AFI) after much of its force was transferred to the new Federal Police (PF). The Federal Investigations Agency itself had replaced the notoriously corrupt Federal Judicial Police (Policía Judicial Federal, PJF) by the presidential decree of former President Vicente Fox on November 1, 2001. In May 2008, the previous acting chief of the AFI, Édgar Eusebio Millán Gómez, was assassinated.

Mexico City Police

The Secretariat of Public Security of Mexico City (Secretaría de Seguridad Pública de la Ciudad de México – SSP), unlike the previous two, does not have national reach, but it does manage a combined force of over 90,000  officers stationed all over Mexico City. The SSP is charged with maintaining public order and safety all over Mexico City.

The investigative Judicial Police of Mexico City (Policía Judicial del ciudad de México – PJCM), are organized under the Office of the Attorney General of Mexico City (Procuraduría General de Justicia de la ciudad de México). The PGJDF maintains 16 precincts (delegaciones) with an estimated 3,500 judicial police, 1,100 investigating agents for prosecuting attorneys (agentes del ministerio público), and 941 experts or specialists (peritos).

The principal police force of Mexico City is the Protection and Transit Directorate, also known as the Traffic Police, which consists of some 32,000 officers organized into thirty-three precincts. It is the largest single law enforcement organization in Mexico.

The Bank and Industrial Police of the Ministry of Public Security of Mexico City provides specialized services for the protection, custody and supervision, not just banks and lending institutions, but also dependencies and pawnshops, among others.

Other

The Secretariat of Government (Secretaría de Gobernación), has Immigration officers who directed by the Mexican Immigration Service, these officers have the right to detain suspected undocumented aliens and, under certain conditions, may deport them without formal deportation proceedings.

The Secretariat of Finance and Public Credit (Secretaría de Hacienda y Crédito Público, Crédito) Customs officers are deployed at borders and at international airports to interdict contraband entering Mexico.

The Bank of Mexico (Banco de México) also operates its own security division, which is charged with enforcing banking and monetary laws, including cases of counterfeiting, fraud, and money laundering.

State Police

Each of the country's thirty-one states maintain both preventive and judicial police called the State Judicial Police. State police are under the direction of the state's governor. The distinction between crimes investigated by State and Federal Judicial Police is not always clear. Most offenses come under the state authorities. Drug dealing, crimes against the government, and offenses involving several jurisdictions are the responsibility of the federal police. The state-level preventive police forces are together perhaps 90,000-strong, and the state-level judicial police perhaps 25,000-strong.

State police forces operate from precinct stations, called delegaciones with each delegación having an average of 200 police officers attached to it. The ranking officer is known as a comandante, equivalent to a first captain in the military. Most of the remaining personnel hold the ranks of first sergeant, second sergeant, and corporal.

 Tamaulipas State Police
 Yucatán State Police

Municipalities
Some of the municipalities of Mexico have their own preventive and municipal police forces (Policia Municipal), which are responsible for handling minor civil disturbances and traffic infractions. Of the 2,457 municipalities, 650 have no police forces. However, some of the municipal forces are large and important.

History
There have historically been multiple government departments with varying levels of responsibility for law enforcement, a situation criticized by experts who suggest that all their functions should be merged into the Public Security Ministry.

Training
Since 2007, all senior police officers from state and federal forces must complete a common year-long training program. However, training at lower levels remains poor. In some municipalities of Chihuahua, the municipal police have received training from Mexican Army advisors.

Private security

Mexican security companies have grown significantly in recent years, in response to the state’s failure to provide security. Mexico holds third place worldwide in the purchase of security equipment. Between 1998 and 1999, private security companies increased some
40 percent. The Mexican government has had serious problems in regulating these companies, most of which are illegitimate since they lack the necessary legal permits. It was estimated in 1999, that about 10,000 private security firms operated in Mexico, yet
only 2,000 had some form of official permit.

According to official figures in December 2000, there were 2,984 private security companies registered with 153,885 employees. The inability to regulate or control these forces creates a potential security problem. Since many of these companies are unregulated, some will engage in criminality instead of (or as a means of) protecting their clients, thus exacerbating the problem of insecurity. According to a study by the Mexico City legislative assembly, in 1998 there were more private security guards than police. A substantial number of private security guards were formerly police officers or presently work as security guards while off-duty; these dynamics increase the likelihood of police corruption.

See also 

 Law enforcement by country
 International Criminal Police Organization (Interpol)
 List of countries and dependencies by number of police officers
 Law of Mexico
 Crime in Mexico
 Terrorism in Mexico

References

External links
 Mexico City Public Safety